Diospyros frutescens is a tree in the family Ebenaceae. Twigs dry to blackish. Inflorescences bear up to 10 flowers. The specific epithet  is from the Latin meaning "shrubby" in this context, referring to the tree's growth style. The habitat is mixed dipterocarp forests from sea-level to  altitude. D. frutescens is found in Thailand, Vietnam and west to central Malesia.

References

frutescens
Plants described in 1826
Flora of Indo-China
Trees of Thailand
Trees of Malesia